The Czechoslovakia national junior handball team is the national under-20 handball team of Czechoslovakia. Controlled by the Czechoslovak Handball Federation, it represents Czechoslovakia in international matches.

Statistics

IHF Junior World Championship record
 Champions   Runners up   Third place   Fourth place

References

External links
World Men's Youth Championship table
European Men's Youth Championship table

Handball in Czechoslovakia
Men's national junior handball teams
Handball